Syzygium nervosum is a species of tree native to tropical Asia and Australia, extending as far north as Guangdong and Guangxi in China and as far south as the Northern Territory of Australia. It was previously known as Cleistocalyx operculatus and also known as C. nervosum (DC.) Kosterm., and Eugenia operculata Roxb., 1832. It is a medium-sized tree of about 10 meters in height with pale brown bark and dull green leaves.

Description
The leaves of S. nervosum are elliptical, obovate and glaborous, measuring 7–9 cm in length.

Flowers cluster as greenish white trichomatous panicles. The blossoms have 4 petals.

The 7–12 mm diameter fruits are ovoid with a concave tip and a wrinkled texture. The fruits turn purplish upon ripening.

Uses
The leaves and buds of S. nervosum are harvested, dried, and brewed as an herbal tea in Vietnam known as "nước vối" with stomachic properties.

Gallery

References

nervosum
Trees of Australia
Ornamental trees
Myrtales of Australia
Flora of Western Australia
Flora of tropical Asia
Flora of China
Plants described in 1828